This is a list of Colonial Governors of Nicaragua.

Governors of Veragua (1508–1536) 
(The Governorate of Veragua was established in 1508 and included the Caribbean Coast of modern Nicaragua. Nicaragua was not conquered until 1522 – 1527) 
 1508–1511 Diego de Nicuesa
 1511–1514 Vasco Núñez de Balboa
 1534–1536 Felipe Gutiérrez y Toledo

Gobernadors of Castilla de Oro (1514–1529) 
(The Governorate of Castilla del Oro was established in 1514 and included the Pacific Coast of modern Nicaragua) 
 1514–1526 Pedro Arias Dávila
 1526–1529 Pedro de los Ríos y Gutiérrez de Aguayo

Governors of Nicaragua (1527–1540) 
(Nicaragua was conquered between 1522 and 1527).
1527–1528: Diego López de Salcedo y Rodríguez
1528–1531: Pedro Arias Dávila
1531–1535: Francisco de Castañeda
1535: Diego Álvarez de Osorio
1536–1542: Rodrigo de Contreras y de la Hoz

Governors of the Province of Nicaragua (1540–1553) 

1542–1544 Rodrigo de Contreras y de la Hoz
1544 Diego de Herrera
1545–1548 Alonso de Maldonado
1548–1552 Alonso López de Cerrato

Alcaldes Mayors of Nicaragua (1552–1567) 
(This was established after the elimination of the Nicaragua Province by Real Audiencia of Guatemala)

1552–1553 Alonso Ortiz de Argueta
1553 Nicolás López de Zárraga
1553–1555 Juan de Cavallón y Arboleda
1555 Juan Márquez
1555–1556 Álvaro de Paz
1556–1557 Nicolás López de Zárraga
1558 Andrés López Moraga
1558–1560 Francisco de Mendoza
1560–1561 Juan de Cavallón y Arboleda
1561–1564 Juan Vázquez de Coronado
1564–1567 Bernardo Bermejo

Governors of the Province of Nicaragua (1565–1787) 
(Provisional reinstatement)

1565 Juan Vázquez de Coronado
1567–1575 Alonso de Casaos
1575–1576 Francisco del Valle Marroquín
1576–1583 Diego de Artieda Chirino y Uclés
1583–1589 Hernando Casco
1589–1592 Carlos de Arellano, interim governor
1592–1593 Bartolomé de Lences, interim governor
1593–1603 Bernardino de Obando
1603–1622 Alonso Lara de Córdoba
1622 Cristóbal de Villagrán, interim governor
1622–1623 Alonso Lazo
1623–1625 Santiago Figueroa
1625–1627 Lázaro de Arbizúa
1627–1630 Juan de Agüero
1630–1634 Francisco de Azagra y Vargas
1634–1641 Pedro de Velasco
1641–1653 Juan de Bracamonte
1653–1659 Juan de Chaves y Mendoza
1660–1665 Diego de Castro
1665–1669 Juan Fernández de Salinas y de la Cerda
1669–1675 Antonio de Temiño y Dávila
1675–1681 Pablo de Loyola
1681–1682 Antonio Coello de Portugal 
1682–1692 Pedro Álvarez Castrillón
1692–1696 Gabriel R. Bravo de Hoyos
1696–1705 Luis de Colmenares
1705–1706 Miguel de Camargo
1706–1720 José Calvo de Lara
1720–1722 Sebastián de Arancibia
1722–1727 Antonio de Poveda
1727–1728 Pedro Martínez de Uparrio, interim governor
1728–1730 Tomás Duque de Estrada 
1730–1739 Bartolomé González Fitoria
1739–1740 Antonio de Ortiz, gobernador
1740–1745 José Antonio Lacayo de Briones y Palacios
1745 Francisco Antoniode Cáceres y Molinedo
1745 Juan de Vera
1745–1746 José Antonio Lacayo de Briones y Palacios 
1746–1752 Alonso Fernández de Heredia
1759–1761 Pantaleón Ibáñez, gobernador
1761–1766 Melchor Vidal de Lorca y Villena, interim governor
1766–1776 Domingo Cabello y Robles
1776–1779 Manuel de Quiroga
1779–1783 José de Estachería
1783–1787 Juan de Ayssa

Intendants de León (1787–1814) 
(The Corregimientos and Alcaldías Mayores were abolished, and their territories were grouped to the Province of Nicaragua to form the Intendancy of León).

1787–1793 Juan de Ayssa 
1794–1811 José Salvador y Antoli
1811–1814 Nicolás García Jerez

Senior political leaders of the Province of Nicaragua y Costa Rica (1812–1814) 
(Unification of the  intendancy of León and the Province of Costa Rica) 
1812–1814 Juan Bautista Gual y Curvelo

Intendants de León (1814–1820) 
(reinstatement)
1814–1816 Juan Bautista Gual y Curvelo
1816–1818 Manuel de Beltranena
1818–1820 Miguel González Saravia y Colarte

Senior political leaders of the Province of Nicaragua y Costa Rica (1820–1821) 
(reinstatement)
1820–1821 Miguel González Saravia y Colarte

See also 
 List of presidents of Nicaragua

Governors of Nicaragua
Nicaragua